Chenghuangmiao station, is an underground metro station in Ningbo, Zhejiang, China. The station is situated on the west of City God Temple of Ningbo. Construction of the station started in December 2010 and the station opened to service on September 26, 2015.

Exits 

Chenghuangmiao Station has 2 exits.

References 

Railway stations in Zhejiang
Railway stations in China opened in 2015
Ningbo Rail Transit stations